Die Knoff-Hoff-Show was a comedy science TV show on the German public broadcaster ZDF. The original series was broadcast between 1986 and 1999; it returned as Die große Knoff-Hoff-Show in 2002–04. The name is a joke German pronunciation of the English expression know-how.

Concept 
He was a presenter in all episodes.

The show explained scientific concepts by means of simple experiments that anyone could replicate. In addition, hobbyists were given the opportunity to present their inventions; these included a pretzel-cutting machine and a foam-throwing machine. Each week, the show included some "crazy" experiments by Knoff-Hoff Professor Charlie (played by Egon Keresztes); these were so absurd, they frequently went wrong.

Die Knoff-Hoff-Show rapidly became one of the most successful science shows on German television. It was dubbed in nine languages and shown on other continents.

History 
The show aired for the first time on 16 February 1986 and ended with Episode 79 on 21 March 1999. Beginning in 2002 ZDF broadcast a second series, titled Die große Knoff-Hoff-Show (The Big Knoff-Hoff Show); this ended in December 2004. According to Bublath, it was canceled because it proved impossible to keep up the pace of experiments ("a new experiment every minute").

There were also two special broadcasts in summer 2005 under the title Der Sommer mit Knoff-Hoff (Summer with Knoff-Hoff).

See also
Bill Nye the Science Guy, an American show
Brainiac: Science Abuse, a British show
, another German show

References

External links 
 

1986 German television series debuts
2004 German television series endings
1990s German television series
ZDF original programming
German-language television shows
Science education television series